The Church of the Incarnation built in 1896 is a historic Carpenter Gothic Episcopal church building located at 111 North 5th Street in Highlands, Macon County, North Carolina.

The Rev. John A. Deal, the first Episcopal missioner in Macon County, was responsible for founding the Church of the Incarnation as well Saint Agnes Episcopal Church in Franklin, the county seat.  Its first building, a Victorian Gothic Revival wood-frame building, was built in 1896; it was listed on the National Register of Historic Places in 1996.  In 2002, a new sanctuary was built on the property and the 1896 building became the chapel.

The Church of the Incarnation is still an active parish in the Episcopal Diocese of Western North Carolina. The Rev. Bentley Manning is the Rector of the parish.

See also

National Register of Historic Places listings in Macon County, North Carolina

References

External links
Church of the Incarnation website
 The History of Incarnation
 "Log House First-" Church of Incarnation Was Organized In 1894, (Published in The Franklin Press, 6 March 1958) By Mrs Helen Thornton

Carpenter Gothic church buildings in North Carolina
Episcopal church buildings in North Carolina
Churches on the National Register of Historic Places in North Carolina
Churches in Macon County, North Carolina
National Register of Historic Places in Macon County, North Carolina
Churches completed in 1896